Roberts Jānis Zvejnieks (born 22 November 1997) is a short track speed skater who competed for Latvia at the 2018 Winter Olympics.

References

External links
 
 
 

1997 births
Living people
Latvian male short track speed skaters
Olympic short track speed skaters of Latvia
Short track speed skaters at the 2018 Winter Olympics